Cormorant Channel Marine Provincial Park is a provincial park in British Columbia, Canada, located in the Pearse Islands, a small archipelago to the east of Cormorant Island and the Village of Alert Bay at the western end of Johnstone Strait.

See also
List of British Columbia provincial parks

References

Provincial parks of British Columbia
Central Coast of British Columbia
1992 establishments in British Columbia
Protected areas established in 1992
Marine parks of Canada